Jahad Rural District is a rural district (dehestan) in Hamidiyeh District, Ahvaz County, Khuzestan Province, Iran. At the 2006 census, its population was 6,756, in 1,141 families.  The rural district has 24 villages.

References 

Rural Districts of Khuzestan Province
Ahvaz County